Alajnihah Air Transport ("the wings", in Arabic) was an airline based in Tripoli, Libya.

Destinations
Alajnihah Airways operated services linking Tripoli, Benghazi, Sabha, Istanbul, Antalya

Fleet
As of January 2008, the Alajnihah Airways fleet consisted of:
1 A320 with 168 Seats
1 A321 with 199 Seats
Aircraft leased from Atlasjet Airlines until Jun 2010.

External links
 https://web.archive.org/web/20070929051051/http://www.alajnihah.com/

Defunct airlines of Libya
Airlines established in 2005
Economy of Tripoli, Libya